Yulia Anatolyevna Managarova (born 27 September 1988) is a Russian handballer for Rostov-Don and the Russian national team.

She played for the Ukrainian national team until 2014.

Personal life
Managarova decided to take the Russian citizenship because of several reasons. She stated, that since the Revolution of Dignity, handball in Ukraine is in a miserable state, mostly due to financial difficulties. On the question which country and city she likes most, Managarova called Russia and Kyiv, stating that her move was not easy.

International honours
European Championship:
Silver Medalist: 2018
EHF Champions League:
Semifinalist: 2012, 2013

Individual awards
 Team of the Tournament Right Wing of the Baia Mare Champions Trophy: 2014
 All-Star Right Wing of Møbelringen Cup: 2017
 All-Star Right Wing of the EHF Champions League: 2018

References

External links

Sportspeople from Dnipro
1988 births
Living people
Ukrainian female handball players
Russian female handball players
Expatriate handball players
Ukrainian expatriate sportspeople in Romania
Ukrainian expatriate sportspeople in Russia
SCM Râmnicu Vâlcea (handball) players
Ukrainian emigrants to Russia
Naturalised citizens of Russia
Handball players at the 2020 Summer Olympics
Medalists at the 2020 Summer Olympics
Olympic medalists in handball
Olympic silver medalists for the Russian Olympic Committee athletes